Promegalonychus is a genus of ground beetles in the family Carabidae. There are about 11 described species in Promegalonychus, found in Africa.

Species
These 11 species belong to the genus Promegalonychus:
 Promegalonychus brauneanus (Burgeon, 1933)  (Burundi, Democratic Republic of the Congo, and Rwanda)
 Promegalonychus calathoides (Basilewsky, 1949)  (Kenya)
 Promegalonychus clarkei Basilewsky, 1975  (Ethiopia)
 Promegalonychus decumanus Basilewsky, 1960  (Democratic Republic of the Congo)
 Promegalonychus fageli Basilewsky, 1953  (Democratic Republic of the Congo)
 Promegalonychus frantonius Basilewsky, 1985  (Cameroon)
 Promegalonychus kivuensis (Burgeon, 1933)  (Democratic Republic of the Congo and Rwanda)
 Promegalonychus oribates (Alluaud, 1917)  (Kenya)
 Promegalonychus pauliani (Burgeon, 1942)  (Cameroon)
 Promegalonychus ruwenzoricus (Burgeon, 1933)  (Democratic Republic of the Congo and Uganda)
 Promegalonychus sphodroides Basilewsky, 1975  (Ethiopia)

References

Platyninae